Bandar Saujana Putra is a township in Kuala Langat District, Selangor, Malaysia. 

It is located across the Klang River from Putra Heights, and across the ELITE toll road from Cyberjaya.

This township is under the administration of Zone7 of the Kuala Langat Municipal Council (MPKL).

Location, Area Description and Demographic
Bandar Saujana Putra is an 850 acres township developed by LBS Bina Berhad in 2003. It is estimated that 20,000 residents live in the township following the completion of 6,000 units.

Saujana Business Park, BSP Village and Saujana Avenue are the only commercial developments that have many amenities to serve the residents of Bandar Saujana Putra, while hospitals, hypermarkets and shopping malls are currently under construction. 

As of 2019, Bandar Saujana Putra consists of 13,000 housing units with a density of 65,000 people.

Education
MAHSA International School and MAHSA University is the only school serving in this township. However, there are nearby schools and universities in Puchong, Shah Alam, UEP Subang Jaya, Kuala Langat, Putra Heights, Putrajaya and Cyberjaya, a 15 to 20 minute drive from the township.

Universities
Multimedia University (Cyberjaya)
Limkokwing University of Creative Technology (Cyberjaya)
Heriot-Watt University (Putrajaya)
MAHSA University (SP2, Bandar Saujana Putra)
Management & Science University (Shah Alam)

Government schools
SMK Bandar Saujana Putra
SK Alam Megah 1, 2 & 3 (Section 27 & 28, Shah Alam)
SMK Alam Megah 1 & 2 (Section 27 & 28, Shah Alam)
SK Seksyen 27 (Section 27 & 28, Shah Alam)
SK Taman Putra Perdana 1 & 2  (Puchong)
SMK Putra Perdana (Puchong)
SK USJ 2, 6 & 20 (UEP Subang Jaya)
SMK USJ 4, 8, 12, 13 & 23 (UEP Subang Jaya)
Sekolah Wawasan USJ 15 (UEP Subang Jaya)
SJK (C) Chee Wen, USJ 1 (UEP Subang Jaya)
SK Jenjarom (Jenjarom)
SMK Jenjarom (Jenjarom)
SMK Puchong Utama 1 & 2 (Puchong)
SK Pulau Meranti (Puchong)
SMK Puchong Batu 14 (Puchong)
Sekolah Rendah Agama Desa Ayer Hitam (Puchong)
SMK Cyberjaya (Cyberjaya)
SRJK (C) Tun Tan Siew Sin (Putra Heights)
SK Putra Heights 2 (Putra Heights)

International schools
Taylor's International School (Puchong)
Kingsley International School (Putra Heights)
Nexus International School (Putrajaya)
Korean School of Malaysia (Cyberjaya)
MAHSA International School (SP1, Bandar Saujana Putra)
Oasis International School (Bandar Rimbayu)

Transport

Car
Bandar Saujana Putra is served by the ELITE toll road (E6) and the South Klang Valley Expressway (SKVE, E26).

Bandar Saujana Putra is about 30 km from the Kuala Lumpur International Airport , 18 km to Cyberjaya, and 6 km to Putra Heights via the ELITE toll road. 

Telok Panglima Garang is 21 km from Bandar Saujana Putra via the SKVE toll road. Regional centre Banting is accessible from Telok Panglima Garang via highway 5.

Public transportation
Public transportation connections from Bandar Saujana Putra are limited.

Previously there was a bus route T760, operated by Nadi Putra, connecting Bandar Saujana Putra to Putra Heights LRT station. The route was cancelled during COVID-19 pandemic lockdown in spring 2020. 

Since December 2020 there is a tour bus operator serving the Bandar Saujana Putra - Putra Heights route only on weekdays.

Recent developments in Bandar Saujana Putra 
 2003 - The launch of township and started with medium low cost homes and shops.
 2009 - Bandar Saujana Putra township expanded with the launch of urban single and double-storey homes. And to cater to the expansion, LBS also launched Saujana Business Park to cater to the residences.
 2010 - BSP launched Saujana Putra Avenue, medium high-end cluster link and semi-detached homes in a guarded community.
 2012 - BSP launched their last landed development in the township, Royal Ivory 2 & Royal Garden.
 2012 - The Malaysian Health Sciences Academy (MAHSA) announced the launch of the new university campus in Bandar Saujana Putra.
 2013 - LBS launch of its first high-rise development in Saujana Putra - Saujana Putra Skypark. A 24-storey serviced residence complete with retail facilities.
 2014 - LBS launched its second high-rise development, BSP21. 
 2015 - The completion of BSP Skypark and MAHSA University Saujana Putra campus.
 2016 - TCS Group launched the TCS Arcadia condominium.
 2017 - The completion of BSP Village.
 2019 - The construction of the flyover to connect SKVE to ELITE has been signed by Seribu Baiduri Sdn Bhd (LBS Bina Group Berhad) with Permodalan Negeri Selangor Berhad (PNSB)
 2020 - The construction of Bandar Saujana Putra Mosque starts  
 2022 - The completion of SMK Bandar Saujana Putra 
 2022 - The construction of BSP Arcadia Condominium starts
 2022 - The construction of SK Bandar Saujana Putra starts

Improvements 
 Jalan SP10 was temporary access road for construction vehicles to Saujana Putra Avenue. After project completed, premix road is done to serve as alternative road to Saujana Putra Avenue.
 Beautifying the lake near Camellia Cottage. Not only will we design the landscaping around the lake, we will also provide a pedestrian walkway and outdoor gym facilities.
 Upon approval from authority, the night market will be relocated from Jalan SP4/26 to SP10. This will be a dedicated area that will be better organized for residents’ convenience.

Upcoming Developments

ONEBSP

Located at the vibrant heart of Saujana Putra.

 56-acre commercial development
 Two and three storey shop offices
 Multi-storey shopping mall
 Extensive F&B choices
 Cinema
 Dedicated entertainment zones
 Open air plazas and courtyards
 Innovative lifestyle zones
 Supermarket
 Street bazaars

References

External links
 Jejambat baharu untuk penduduk Bandar Saujana Putra 
 PM: Local medical schools need to offer high quality education
 https://web.archive.org/web/20150616030325/http://www.mahsa.edu.my/wp-content/uploads/2013/08/Intl-StuGuide-2013.pdf
 http://www.lbs.com.my/latest-news/events-happenings/2013/01/09/lbs-launches-bsp-skypark-high-rise-development
 http://www.thestar.com.my/News/Community/2013/02/15/Link-from-Teluk-Panglima-Garang-to-Pulau-Indah-to-be-ready-in-September.aspx
 http://www.starproperty.my/index.php/articles/property-news/update-all-non-bumi-units-of-bandar-rimbayus-phase-2-sold-out/
 http://www.starproperty.my/index.php/articles/property-news/dijaya-buys-land-for-rm1-3bil-to-build-self-contained-township-in-canal-city-selangor/
 https://archive.today/20130918084640/http://propertyzone.com.my/blog/chimes-bandar-rimbayu-detailed-analysis
 http://www.flightradar24.com/2.76,101.69/10

Kuala Langat District